Checkerboard Mesa is an iconic  elevation Navajo Sandstone summit located in Zion National Park, in Kane County of southwest Utah, United States. Its nearest neighbor is Crazy Quilt Mesa, one-half mile immediately west, and separated by Checkerboard Mesa Canyon. This canyon holds pools of rainwater which provide a vital source of water for resident bighorn sheep. This feature's name was officially adopted in 1935 by the U.S. Board on Geographic Names. The descriptive name stems from the cliff's distinctive multitudinous check lines in cross-bedded white sandstone which give the impression of a checkerboard. The horizontal lines are caused by cross-bedding, a remnant of ancient sand dunes. The vertical and sub-vertical lines formed by the contraction and expansion of the sandstone caused by temperature changes, freezing and thawing cycles, in combination with wetting and drying. This peak was originally named Checkerboard Mountain by the park's third superintendent, Preston P. Patraw. Precipitation runoff from this mountain drains into tributaries of the Virgin River.

Climate
Spring and fall are the most favorable seasons to visit Checkerboard Mesa. According to the Köppen climate classification system, it is located in a Cold semi-arid climate zone, which is defined by the coldest month having an average mean temperature below , and at least 50% of the total annual precipitation being received during the spring and summer.

See also

 Geology of the Zion and Kolob canyons area
 Colorado Plateau

Gallery

References

External links
 Zion National Park National Park Service
 Checkerboard Mesa rock climbing: mountainproject.com
 Weather forecast: National Weather Service
 Media related to Checkerboard Mesa: Wikimedia Commons (category)

Mountains of Utah
Zion National Park
Sandstone formations of the United States
Colorado Plateau
Landforms of Kane County, Utah
Mesas of Utah